Berkhof or Berkhoff is a surname from Dutch and German origin. The name falls under the so-called farm names. Such a name served as an address in a time when street names were not commonly used. The name has two meanings. In the Netherlands that is 'birch-farm' or 'birch-farmhouse'.  To leave no doubt there would have stood one or more birch tree(s) in the yard. In Germany the name means 'farm on a hill'. The name is here a variant of the surname .

Origin 
Fairly common practice in farm names was that the lessee (tenant) of the farm and his family received the farm name as an addition behind the first name and the patronymic. Primarily, however, was the name connected to the farmhouse and the yard. This meant that a new, succeeding lessee and his family could also become known by the farm name. This way several unrelated families can have their name derived from one and the same farm. Because the lessee and his descendants that had left the farm, often continued in using the farm name by which they had become generally known. In The Netherlands as well as in Northwest-Germany several of these farms-of-origin are known. The oldest known references of these date from the early sixteenth and even one from the end of the fifteenth century.

Notable persons with the surname
 Aster Berkhof, pseudonym of the Flemish writer Lode Van Den Bergh (born 1932)
 Gé Berkhof (born 1934), Dutch Lieutenant General (ret.)
 Gerrit Berkhoff (1901–1996), Dutch Chemist and first Rector Magnificus University Twente, The Netherlands
 Hendrikus Berkhof (1914–1995), Dutch Preacher and Theologian
 Karel C. Berkhoff (born 1965), Dutch Historian
 Louis Berkhof (1873–1957), Dutch-American Theologian
 Steven Berkoff (born 1937), British actor
 Wicher Berkhoff (Russian: Vasily Ivanovich Berkov), (1794–1870), Dutch-Russian shipbuilder
 Willem Berkhoff (1863–1953), Dutch Pastry Chef and founder first Dutch Vocational School for Pastry Chefs, in Amsterdam

Footnotes

Sources
 Marnix Berkhoff, 'Surname History (version 04/01/2010)', website: Berkhof-Berkhoff. 1500-2000

External links
 Berkhof-Berkhoff. DNA Projekt

Dutch-language surnames
Surnames of Dutch origin
German-language surnames
Surnames of German origin